Claire Holden Rothman is a Canadian novelist, short story writer, and translator.

Personal life
Holden Rothman resides in Montreal, Quebec with actor and writer Arthur Holden.

Works
Salad Days (1990, short stories)
Black Tulips (1999, short stories)
The Heart Specialist (2009, novel)
My October (2014, novel)
Lear's Shadow (2018, novel)

Awards

References

External links
Claire Holden Rothman

1958 births
Canadian women novelists
Canadian women short story writers
20th-century Canadian short story writers
21st-century Canadian novelists
Writers from Montreal
Anglophone Quebec people
Living people
Jewish Canadian writers
20th-century Canadian women writers
21st-century Canadian women writers
20th-century Canadian translators
21st-century Canadian translators
21st-century Canadian short story writers
Canadian women non-fiction writers